= A Battle For The Soul of New York =

2002 history book by Warren Sloat

A Battle for the Soul of New York: Tammany Hall, Police Corruption, Vice, and Reverend Charles Parkhurst's Crusade Against Them, 1892-1895
- Author: Warren Sloat
- Original title: A Battle for the Soul of New York: Tammany Hall, Police Corruption, Vice, and Reverend Charles Parkhurst's Crusade Against Them, 1892-1895
- Genre: History; Non-fiction
- Published: January 1, 2002 (First Cooper Square Press)
- Publication place: United States of America
- Media type: Print

A Battle For the Soul of New York: Tammany Hall, Police Corruption, Vice, and Reverend Charles Parkhurst's Crusade Against Them, 1892-1895 is a non-fiction book by Warren Sloat, first published by First Cooper Square Press in 2002. It chronicles, in eight parts, police corruption in New York City as facilitated by the political organization Tammany Hall.

== Reception ==
The Library Journal wrote a mixed review for the book, writing "Although filled with authentic atmosphere, the writing can seem cluttered by excessive detail." Booklist was more favorable, praising its drawings and stating that the "wonderfully narrated history has a cast of characters that could only be found in New York".
